Pingtung Plain is a plain area including parts of Pingtung County and Kaohsiung City in Taiwan. It includes the alluvial fan of Kaoping River, which forms the largest drainage area of rivers in Taiwan, and also passed by other shorter rivers such as Tungkang River, Linbian River and Shihwen River (士文溪). The plain faces the Taiwan Strait on the southwest, lies to the east of Kaohsiung City, and at the west of Central Mountain Range.

See also
 Geography of Taiwan

References

Plains of Taiwan
Landforms of Pingtung County
Landforms of Kaohsiung